"Great Divide" is a song written and performed by the American pop/rock band Hanson. It is the first single from their fourth album, The Walk (2007). Lead vocals are provided by Taylor Hanson.

The song was released on iTunes in the UK and the U.S. as an exclusive single before the release of the album. All proceeds from the online purchase went to the Perinatal HIV Research Unit in Soweto, South Africa - a hospital that helps reduce the transmission of pre-natal HIV/AIDS.

Track listing
Written by Isaac Hanson, Taylor Hanson and Zac Hanson.

 "Great Divide" (Album version) – 3:43

Promotional single listing (released to mainstream radio)
 "Great Divide" (Radio edit) – 3:30

External links
 

2006 singles
Charity singles
Hanson (band) songs
Songs written by Isaac Hanson
Songs written by Taylor Hanson
Songs written by Zac Hanson
2006 songs